Kubinke the Barber (German: Kubinke, der Barbier, und die drei Dienstmädchen) is a 1926 German silent comedy film directed by Carl Boese and starring Werner Fuetterer, Erika Glässner and Käthe Haack.

The film's sets were designed by the art director Otto Moldenhauer.

Cast
Werner Fuetterer as Kubinke, barber
Erika Glässner
Käthe Haack
Hilde Maroff
Erich Kaiser-Titz
Julius Falkenstein
Fritz Kampers
Robert Garrison
Marie Grimm-Einödshofer
Eddie Seefeld
Ferdinand Martini
Maria Forescu
Walter Karel
Eva Speyer 
Antonie Jaeckel
Gustl Körner

References

External links

Films of the Weimar Republic
Films directed by Carl Boese
German silent feature films
German comedy films
1926 comedy films
German black-and-white films
National Film films
Silent comedy films
1920s German films
1920s German-language films